Agrimonia pubescens, the soft agrimony or downy agrimony, is a flowering plant in the genus Agrimonia, a member of the rose family. It grows in dry areas and woodlands.

Taxonomy
The species was first described by John Torrey and Asa Gray as Agrimonia eupatoria var. mollis. It was raised to a species by Nathaniel Lord Britton after the description by Karl Friedrich Wilhelm Wallroth.

Description
It has erect and canescent or pubescent stems. The five to thirteen leaflets are oblong and dentate, and pinnately divided once. The leaflets increase in size as they approach the top of the compound leaf. The yellow flowers are borne on spike-like racemes. The five sparsely pubescent sepals alternate with the petals. The small flowers and conical fruit have short pedicels. The seeds have hook-like projections and are clustered in a bell-like shape. The glabrous calyx measures  while fruiting.

The plant flowers from July through September.

References

pubescens
Plants described in 1842
Taxa named by Karl Friedrich Wilhelm Wallroth